The Stiftskirche St. Gallus und Otmar (Collegiate Church of St. Gall and Otmar) is a Roman Catholic church in the city of St. Gallen, Switzerland. Part of the Abbey of St. Gall, it has been the cathedral of the Diocese of St. Gallen since 1847.

Completed in 1767, the cathedral was designed by Peter Thumb, who also designed the Abbey's famous library. Among its rich decorations are frescoes painted mostly by Josef Wannenmacher, and the most complete set of historic church bells in Switzerland. The south altar features a bell brought back by Saint Gall himself from Ireland, one of the three oldest surviving bells in Europe.

References

External links
 
  

Abbey of Saint Gall
Roman Catholic cathedrals in Switzerland
Baroque church buildings in Switzerland
Roman Catholic churches completed in 1767
18th-century Roman Catholic church buildings in Switzerland